The Revolutionary Socialist Party, abbreviated to RSP, was a far-left party in Luxembourg. At its start, it was a Trotskiyst group active in the late sixties in the General Association of Luxembourgish Students. When the majority of students' group became Maoist and was transformed in the Revolutionary Socialist Left, the Trotskyist minority split and founded the Revolutionary Communist League in September 1970. It published Klassenkampf starting in 1970, and in December 1984 was renamed the Revolutionary Socialist Party and published Sozialistesch Aktioun until 1992.

The party had more than 100 members in the early seventies and 27 in 1985.

Under both names, it took part in the elections to Luxembourgish parliament from 1974 until 1989, winning no seats and between 0.2 and 0.4% of the vote. In the European elections between 1979 and 1989 it won between 0.4 and 0.6%.

In 1994 the RSP became part of the New Left which was founded by a faction of the Communist Party of Luxembourg. When The Left was established in 1999 by the New Left and the Communist Party, the RSP dissolved and its members joined the new party.

Leading members of the RSP were Robert Engel, André Kremer, Gaston Kremer, Jean-Pierre "Jhemp" Lulling, Robert Mertzig, Marc Reckinger, Joseph Wirth. The former RSP militants Justin Turpel, Antoine Jost and Thérèse Gorza are prominent members of The Left.

See also
Revolutionary Socialist Youth

Footnotes

References 

Political parties in Luxembourg
Communist parties in Luxembourg
Political parties established in 1970
Defunct political parties in Luxembourg
Fourth International (post-reunification)
1999 disestablishments in Luxembourg
1970 establishments in Luxembourg
Political parties disestablished in 1999